The Washington D.C. Area Film Critics Association Award for Best Foreign Language Film is an annual award given by the Washington D.C. Area Film Critics Association.

Winners and nominees

2000s

2010s

2020s

References

Foreign Language Film, Best
Film awards for Best Foreign Language Film